Rosedene is an unincorporated rural community in West Lincoln Township, Niagara Region, Ontario, Canada.

History
Rosedene had a post office from 1862 to 1913.

The population in 1910 was 50.

A chapter of the Federated Women's Institutes of Ontario was located in Rosedene from 1909 to 2007.

References

Populated places in the Regional Municipality of Niagara